Polygonatum arisanense is a flowering plant within the Asparagaceae family. The species is endemic to Taiwan and is found in areas around 1,500 meters in elevation. Its Chinese common name and species name refer to the Alishan Range.

References
 

Endemic flora of Taiwan
arisanense